Virgin Soil Upturned is a 1959 Soviet drama film directed by Aleksandr Ivanov. Based on Mikhail Sholokhov's novel.

Plot 
The film takes place in the 1930s. The film tells about the worker Davydov, who is sent to the Cossack farm to help the Don Cossacks transition to collective forms of farming and tries to organize a collective farm there by their own methods, coming into conflict with the leader of the local party.

Cast 
 Pyotr Chernov as Semyon Davydov
 Yevgeny Matveyev as Makar Nagulnov
 Fyodor Shmakov as Andrey Razmyotnov
 Vladimir Dorofeyev as Grandpa Shchukar
 Lyudmila Khityaeva as Lushka
 Pyotr Glebov as Aleksandr Polovtsev
 Viktor Chekmaryov as Yakov Ostrovnov
 Iosif Kutyansky as Kondrat Maydannikov
 Leonid Kmit as Grigoriy Bannik
 Oleg Yaroshenko as Timofey Rvanyy
  Andrei Abrikosov as the blacksmith Ippolit Sidorovich Shaly
  Nikolay Kryuchkov as  Ustin Mikhailovich Rykalin
 Yevgeni Lebedev as Agafon Dubtsov
 Oleg Basilashvili as Cossack
 Gennadi Nilov as episode
 Nikolai Kryukov as Tit  Borodin

References

External links 
 

1959 films
1950s Russian-language films
Soviet drama films
1959 drama films
Lenfilm films
Films set in the 1930s
Films based on Russian novels